Edward Caddick (21 June 1931 – 9 June 2017) was an English television actor. He appeared in many British and Australian television series and films, which include Doctor Who, The Vulture, The Avengers, Department S, Robbery Under Arms, Playing Beatie Bow and others.

His theatre work included "King John", "The Royal Hunt of the Sun", "The Master Builder" and other plays.

Caddick was educated at the Royal Central School of Speech and Drama, graduating in 1955. In the mid-1960s, he penned two novels: Paddy on Sundays (1965, about young evacuees during WWII) and Hannah and the Peacocks (1966, about a young couple trying to find themselves). By the early 1970s, he had given up acting to become a teacher and soon emigrated to Australia. There, Caddick worked as a radio actor and writer, penning scripts for The Sunday Play, with a brief return to screen acting in the 1980s.

Acting credits

References

External links

Edward Caddick at Theatricalia

1931 births
2017 deaths
English male television actors
Australian male television actors
British emigrants to Australia